Public holidays in Washington may refer to:

 Public holidays in Washington (state)
 Public holidays in Washington, D.C.